Cannabinoids are compounds found in the cannabis plant or synthetic compounds that can interact with the endocannabinoid system. The most notable cannabinoid is the phytocannabinoid tetrahydrocannabinol (THC) (Delta-9-THC), the primary intoxicating compound in cannabis. Cannabidiol (CBD) is another major constituent of some cannabis plants. At least 113 distinct cannabinoids have been isolated from cannabis.

This article gives comparative structures of some of the more common natural and synthetic cannabinoids, as well as showing structures of legally banned and sanctioned cannabinoids.

Structures

Legality

Thermal properties

Conversion temperatures

Decarboxylation temperatures 

Upon heating, cannabinoid acids decarboxylate to give their psychoactive cannabinoid. For example, Delta-9-tetrahydrocannabinol (THC) is the main psychoactive compound found in cannabis and is responsible for the "high" feeling when consumed. However, cannabis does not naturally contain significant amounts of THC. Instead, tetrahydrocannabinolic acid (THCA) is found naturally in raw and live cannabis and is non-intoxicating. Over time, THCA slowly converts to THC through a process of decarboxylation over the course of roughly a year, but can be sped up with exposure to high temperatures. When heated under conditions of 110 °C, decarboxylation generally occurs in 30–45 minutes. This is added to cannabis edibles. When consumed orally, the liver breaks down and metabolizes THC into the more potent 11-hydroxy-THC.

All cannabinoids listed here and their acids are found naturally in the plant to varying degrees.

Vaporization temperatures 

Dry-herb vaporizers can be used to inhale cannabis in its flower form. There are 483 identifiable chemical constituents known to exist in the cannabis plant, and at least 85 different cannabinoids have been isolated from the plant.

The cannabinoids listed here are found in the plant but only in trace amounts. However, they have also been extracted and sold as isolates online. Third party certification may help ensure buyers to avoid synthetic cannabinoids.

Structural scheduling

References 

Drug-related lists
Comparison of psychoactive substances